The Divyāvadāna or Divine narratives is a Sanskrit anthology of Buddhist avadana tales, many originating in Mūlasarvāstivādin vinaya texts. It may be dated to 2nd century CE. The stories themselves are therefore quite ancient and may be among the first Buddhist texts ever committed to writing, but this particular collection of them is not attested prior to the seventeenth century. Typically, the stories involve the Buddha explaining to a group of disciples how a particular individual, through actions in a previous life, came to have a particular karmic result in the present. A predominant theme is the vast merit accrued from making offerings to enlightened beings or at stupas and other holy sites related to the Buddha.

Contents
The anthology contains 38 avadana stories in all, including the well-known Aśokāvadāna "Legend of Aśoka", which was translated into English by John Strong (Princeton, 1983). The collection has been known since the dawn of Buddhist studies in the West, when it was excerpted in Eugène Burnouf's history of Indian Buddhism (1844). The first Western edition of the Sanskrit text was published in 1886 by Edward Byles Cowell and R.A. Neil. The Sanskrit text was again edited by P. L. Vaidya in 1959.

Sahasodgata-avadāna, in the opening paragraphs, describe the Buddha's instructions for creating the bhavacakra (wheel of life).

Rudrāyaṇa-avadāna explains how the Buddha gave the first illustration of the Buddha to King Rudrayaṇa. According to this story, at the time of the Buddha, King Rudrayana (a.k.a. King Udayana) offered a gift of a jeweled robe to King Bimbisara of Magadha. King Bimbisara was concerned that he did not have anything of equivalent value to offer as a gift in return. Bimbisara went to the Buddha for advice, and the Buddha gave instructions to have the first drawing of the Buddha himself send the drawing to Rudrayana. It is said that Rudrayana attained realization through seeing this picture.

List of Stories
This is the list of stories contained in the Divyāvadāna:

Selected English translations

Original Sanskrit

References

External links
The Divyâvadâna: a collection of early Buddhist legends by E. B. Cowell (English transliteration)
Divyavadana (1959) by  P. L. Vaidya (Sanskrit)
 

Sanskrit texts
Early Buddhist texts
Indian anthologies
Indian folklore
Indian literature
Indian legends